Badlands (stylized in all caps) is the debut studio album by American singer Halsey. It was released on August 28, 2015 through Astralwerks. Musically, Badlands is an electropop, dark pop, alternative pop, synth-pop, and pop record featuring industrial undertones. Halsey wrote every song on the album when she was 19, while production was handled by a number of producers. Norwegian producer Lido was one of the main producers on Badlands. The album was described by Halsey as lacking a "proper radio hit".

The album debuted at number two on the Billboard 200 albums chart in the United States with first-week sales of 115,000 copies, 97,000 of that estimate being pure album sales. The album was eventually certified double Platinum by the Recording Industry Association of America (RIAA). Badlands found success in many countries outside of the United States; it reached the top ten of the music charts of Australia, Belgium, Canada, Ireland, New Zealand, the Netherlands, Portugal, Scotland and the United Kingdom. It was also certified Gold in several countries, including Australia, Brazil, Canada, and the United Kingdom. The album was further promoted by Halsey's debut headlining world concert tour, the Badlands Tour (2015–2016).

The album was preceded by the release of two singles: "Ghost", which was also a re-released single from Halsey's introductory EP Room 93 (2014), and "New Americana", which peaked at number 60 on the Billboard Hot 100 songs chart in the United States, marking Halsey's first appearance on the chart. The third single from the album, "Colors", was released on February 9, 2016, and became the album's most streamed track on Spotify; it also became the album's best-selling track worldwide. A new version of the song "Castle" was released as the album's fourth single to promote the feature film The Huntsman: Winter's War (2016). “Hold Me Down” was released as the first promotional single ahead of the album on June 1, 2015. It was certified Gold in Australia and the US. "Drive" was released as the second and final promotional single on August 21, 2015. The track is certified Gold in the US. Outside of the singles, other tracks from the album that achieved notable certifications were "Gasoline", "Hurricane", and "Control". "Gasoline" additionally became one of the album's most popular tracks despite only appearing on the deluxe version of Badlands; it has more than 300 million streams on Spotify. Furthermore, "Roman Holiday" was featured in the second season of the American TV series Younger and "I Walk the Line" was featured in the teaser trailer for the film Power Rangers (2017).

Title and music
The name "Badlands" refers to Halsey's state of mind while writing the album, to give a physical place as a metaphor for a desolate and lonely mind. Musically, the album is mainly rooted in electropop, dark pop, alternative pop, synth-pop, and pop and features industrial undertones.

Production
According to Halsey, Badlands is a concept album focusing on the fictional dystopian society known as The Badlands. A desert wasteland surrounds the city, keeping the inhabitants of The Badlands captive. The album was inspired by post-apocalyptic films such as The Fifth Element. After writing the first few songs, Halsey realized the entire concept was a metaphor for her mental state. Halsey states she created the Badlands to escape from her real-life struggles. In her opinion, the metaphor was even with no escape, there is still hope there is somewhere else to go. Lido served as the album's executive producer.

Singles
"Ghost" was released as Halsey's debut single on October 27, 2014, with an accompanying music video filmed in Tokyo, which was directed by Malia James and Ryan Witt. "Ghost" was released to radio on April 7, 2015.

"New Americana" was released as the second single from the album on July 10, 2015. The official music video premiered on September 25, 2015. The song peaked at number 60 on the Billboard Hot 100, being the only single from Badlands to enter the chart. It has since been certified Platinum in Canada, Italy, and the US and Gold in Australia and New Zealand.

Halsey announced "Colors" as the third single on January 21, 2016. It impacted alternative radio on February 9, 2016 with its music video being released a few weeks later on February 25, 2016 featuring Tyler Posey. It reached number eight on the Bubbling Under Hot 100 and was certified Silver in the UK, Gold in Australia, and double Platinum in the US.

The fourth and final single, "Castle", was released on April 9, 2016 as part of the soundtrack for the film The Huntsman: Winter's War which features an alternative version of the song. The music video later premiered on April 13, 2016 and peaked at number one on the Bubbling Under Hot 100 It was certified Gold in Australia and Platinum in the US.

Promotional singles

On June 1, 2015 Halsey announced via Twitter the pre-order for Badlands along with the release of the album's first promotional single, "Hold Me Down". The song became one of the album's most popular tracks achieving over 100 million streams on Spotify and being certified Gold in Australia and the US.

On August 21, 2015 "Drive" was released as the album's second and final promotional single.

Critical reception

In a review for Pitchfork, Nathan Reese wrote, "Reading interviews with Halsey you get the sense of a canny and talented performer, one who legitimately wants to connect with fans. But the public persona only comes through on Badlands in fits and starts, and there isn't a single subversive or original second on the album." About the chorus on "New Americana", he commented, "Like most of Badlands, it's calculated, defiant, and, ultimately, hollow." In a short review, Rolling Stones Joe Levy called Halsey a "new popstar with a knack for sticky imagery". The album was included at number six on Rock Sounds top 50 releases of 2015 list.

Commercial performance
The album debuted at number two on the Billboard 200 with a total of 115,000 equivalent units (97,000 in pure album sales), which marked the highest-charting album released by the Astralwerks record company so far. As of June 2017, the album had sold 520,000 copies in the US. In December 2017, it was announced that Badlands had reached one billion streams on Spotify. Badlands was later certified 2× platinum by the Recording Industry Association of America for sales of two million units in the United States.

The album debuted at number nine on the UK Albums Chart, selling 8,225 copies in its first week. By June 2017, it had sold 106,804 copies in the United Kingdom. Elsewhere, Badlands reached number two in Australia, number three in New Zealand and Ireland, number five in the Netherlands, and number 10 in Belgium (Flanders).

Track listing

Notes
  signifies an additional producer
  signifies a remixer

Sample credits
 "Hold Me Down" contains a sample of "Easy" (2014) by Son Lux.
 "New Americana" contains an interpolation of "Juicy Fruit" (1983) by Mtume.

Personnel
Credits adapted from the liner notes of the deluxe edition of Badlands.

Musicians

 Halsey – vocals
 Jayda Brown – children's choir 
 Emma Gunn – children's choir 
 Levi Gunn – children's choir 
 Merit Leighton – children's choir 
 Mason Purece – children's choir 
 Tim Anderson – all instruments (except guitar), programming 
 Aron Forbes – guitar 
 Chris Spilfogel – additional programming 
 Dan Grech-Marguerat – additional programming

Technical

 Lido – production ; additional production ; executive production
 The Futuristics – production 
 Kalkutta – additional production 
 Larzz Principato – additional production 
 Tim Anderson – production 
 Aron Forbes – additional production 
 Chris Spilfogel – additional production 
 Captain Cuts – production 
 Dylan Scott – production 
 Dylan William – production ; additional production ; vocal production
 Tim Larcombe – production 
 Yung Gud – additional production 
 Justyn Pilbrow – production 
 S.A. – production 
 Charlie Hugall – production 
 Heavy Mellow – additional production 
 Trevor Simpson – production 
 Sam Miller – production 
 Dan Grech-Marguerat – mix
 Pete Lyman – mastering

Artwork
 Sarah Barlow – photography
 Steve Schofield – photography
 Garrett Hilliker – art direction

Charts

Weekly charts

Year-end charts

Certifications

Release history

References
Citations

Sources

 

2015 debut albums
Astralwerks albums
Dystopian music
Halsey (singer) albums
Science fiction concept albums